Wraith Overlord: Terror Beneath the City State is a 1981 fantasy role-playing game supplement published by Judges Guild for any role-playing game.

Contents
Wraith Overlord: Terror Beneath the City State is a package that describes underground areas of Judges Guild's City State of the Invincible Overlord.

Reception
Lewis Pulsipher reviewed Wraith Overlord: Terror Beneath the City State in The Space Gamer No. 51. Pulsipher commented that "If you use City State you'll probably want this package. Otherwise you can probably find something more suitable to spend [money] for, though this is, by Judges Guild standards, good material."

References

Judges Guild fantasy role-playing game supplements
Role-playing game supplements introduced in 1981